Ragıp Aytuğ Tunal (born 14 April 1983), better known by his stage name Hayki, is a Turkish rapper and songwriter. He established a music company called PMC with other Turkish rappers, Patron and Da Poet. In 2017, he Published a song called B1R. He had to leave PMC after having some problems with his old friend Patron. He established the music company "Unique Fabric".

Discography

Albums and EPs 
 SSSS (2008) 
 Paşa Rhyme (2008)
 High Kick Low Punch (2009)
 Bilinmeyen Artizzzler (ft. Şehinşah & Fieber) (2010)
 Bir Kaç Milyar Soluk (2012)
 PMC Volume One (ft. Patron) (2014)
 2005-2015 Compilation (2017)
 Ol (2018)
 Kötü Adam (Ajna) (2020)

Singles and duets 

 Uyuyorum Bi' Dakka (ft. Fünye) (2006)
 Click Dann (2007)
 Eyvah (ft. Da Poet) (2008)
 Zıpla Bunaldığında (ft. Patron) (2010)
 Madalyon (ft. Grogi & Nomad) (2011)
 Manifesto (ft. Allâme) (2012)
 Sürgün (ft. Patron) (2013)
 Ego (ft. Patron & Anıl Piyancı) (2013)
 Kara Para (ft. Anıl Piyancı & Defkhan & Allâme) (2016)
 Tablo (ft. Yener Çevik & Eypio) (2016)
 Uzay (ft. Onur Uğur & Patron) (2017)
 B1R (2017)
 Katil (ft. Eypio) (2017)
 Tarih (ft. Aspova) (2019)
 Kargalar (2019)
 Katliam 3 (ft. Massaka, Anıl Piyancı, Dr. Fuchs, Tekmill, Yener Çevik, Canbay & Wolker, Diablo63, Şanışer, Sansar Salvo, Defkhan, Sir-Dav, Rota) (2019)
 Susamam (ft. Şanışer, Fuat Ergin, Ados, Server Uraz, Beta, Tahribad-ı İsyan, Sokrat St, Ozbi, Deniz Tekin, Sehabe, Yeis Sensura, Aspova, Defkhan, Aga B, Mirac, Mert Şenel, Kamufle) (2019)
 Söylesene (ft. Behz) (2019)
 Kol Bozuk (2019)
 Tahammülüm Yok (2019)
 Dolunay (2019)
 Ofsayt (2019)
 Deli (2019)
 Gömelim mi (ft. Olvi) (2019)
 Panter (ft. Omero) (2020)
 Fareli Köyün Kavalcısı (2020)
 UF! (ft. Omero & GOKO! & Olvi & Fredd & Simurg) (2020)
 ŞIKIR ŞIKIR (2020)
 Doğru Kötüler Yanlış İyiler (2020)
 Kay Kay (ft. Eypio) (2020)
 Turkish Nightmare (ft. Uzi & Motive & Eko Fresh & Killa Hakan) (2020)
 Seni De Vururlar (2021)
 Koma Beni El Yerine (2021)
 Elmas (ft. Omero) (2021)
 MANTRA (2021)
 Bedel (ft. Rota) (2021)
 Bu Son (ft. Fredd) (2021)
 Bir Şansım Var (ft. Can Kazaz) (2021)
 Zirve 2 ft. (Rota & Defkhan & Burak King & Hayki & Yener Çevik)
 Jeton (ft. Kezzo)
 Rüzgar (ft. Ceza)

References 

Turkish rappers
Musicians from Istanbul
Living people
1983 births
Turkish lyricists
21st-century Turkish male singers
21st-century Turkish singers